Christina Meier-Höck (born 20 February 1966, in Rottach-Egern) is a German former alpine skier who competed in the 1988 Winter Olympics, 1992 Winter Olympics, and 1994 Winter Olympics.

External links
 

1966 births
Living people
People from Miesbach (district)
Sportspeople from Upper Bavaria
Olympic alpine skiers of Germany
Olympic alpine skiers of West Germany
Alpine skiers at the 1988 Winter Olympics
Alpine skiers at the 1992 Winter Olympics
Alpine skiers at the 1994 Winter Olympics
German female alpine skiers
20th-century German women